Destruction (2012) was a professional wrestling pay-per-view (PPV) event promoted by New Japan Pro-Wrestling (NJPW). The event took place on September 23, 2012, in Kobe, Hyōgo, at the Kobe World Memorial Hall. The event featured nine matches, two of which were contested for championships. It was the sixth event under the Destruction name.

Storylines
Destruction featured nine professional wrestling matches that involved different wrestlers from pre-existing scripted feuds and storylines. Wrestlers portrayed villains, heroes, or less distinguishable characters in the scripted events that built tension and culminated in a wrestling match or series of matches.

Event
The event featured the professional wrestling return match of both Katsuyori Shibata and Kazushi Sakuraba, two longtime mixed martial artists, who defeated Hiromu Takahashi and Wataru Inoue. The event also featured outside participation from freelancer Daisuke Sasaki, Kaientai Dojo representative Kengo Mashimo and Pro Wrestling Noah representative Naomichi Marufuji, who unsuccessfully challenged Hiroshi Tanahashi for the IWGP Heavyweight Championship in the main event. During the event, Kota Ibushi successfully defended the IWGP Junior Heavyweight Championship against Ryusuke Taguchi.

Results

References

External links
The official New Japan Pro-Wrestling website

2012
2012 in professional wrestling
September 2012 events in Japan